Pochidia is a commune in Vaslui County, Western Moldavia, Romania. It is composed of four villages: Borodești, Pochidia, Satu Nou and Sălceni. These were part of Tutova Commune until 2004, when they were split off.

References

Communes in Vaslui County
Localities in Western Moldavia